The Fitzalan Chapel is the chancel of the church of St Nicholas in the western grounds of Arundel Castle.

The church of St Nicholas is one of the very few church buildings that is divided into two worship areas, a Roman Catholic area (the chancel) and an Anglican area (the nave and transepts). The chancel of the Fitzalan Chapel, is used as the private mausoleum of the Dukes of Norfolk. It is a Grade I listed building.

Richard FitzAlan, 10th Earl of Arundel, was responsible for the building of the Chapel posthumously according to his will. The original Fitzalan Chapel consisted of the entire building, and was built as the Collegiate Church of the Holy Trinity in 1380 by commission of Richard FitzAlan, 11th Earl of Arundel, whose family owned Arundel Castle.  It is an example of Perpendicular Gothic architecture, and the architect and mason is believed to have been William Wynford.  A number of noted Fitzalan and Howard family members are buried in the chapel, many in tombs adorned with sculpted effigies.  Most of the recently deceased Dukes of Norfolk are buried there.

The chapel was badly damaged in 1643 during the siege of Arundel Castle by the Parliamentarians' cannons during the English Civil War.  It remained neglected throughout the 18th century. During this period, the Anglican parish was established in the western portion of the church building. Bernard Howard, 12th Duke of Norfolk, is credited with initiating major repairs to the Fitzalan Chapel circa 1837, and his successors expanded and restored the chapel further.

Fitzalan Chapel is now vested in an independent charitable trust (No. 279379), and accepts donations for further maintenance and preservation.  It is currently open to the public by access from the castle grounds.

Burials

 Thomas FitzAlan, 12th Earl of Arundel (1381–1415)
 his wife, Beatrice, Countess of Arundel (c. 1382–1439)
 John FitzAlan, 13th Earl of Arundel (1385–1421)
 his wife, Eleanor Berkeley (d. 1455), daughter of Sir John Berkeley of Beverstone, Gloucestershire
 John FitzAlan, 14th Earl of Arundel (1408–1435)
 William FitzAlan, 16th Earl of Arundel (1417–1487)
 his wife Joan Neville (1434–1462), eldest daughter of Richard Neville, 5th Earl of Salisbury
 Thomas Salmon (d. 1430), Chamberlain to King Henry V
 his wife, Agnes Salmon (d. 1418), Principal Lady-in-Waiting to Beatrice, Countess of Arundel.
 William FitzAlan, 18th Earl of Arundel (1476–1544)
 his second wife, Lady Anne Percy, Countess of Arundel (d. 1552), a daughter of Henry Percy, 4th Earl of Northumberland
 Henry FitzAlan, 19th Earl of Arundel (1512–1580)
 his second wife, Mary Arundell, daughter of John Arundell (1474–1545)
 Mary FitzAlan (1540–1557), first wife of Thomas Howard, 4th Duke of Norfolk was first buried at St. Clement Danes Church and decades later her remains were transferred to Fitzalan Chapel.
 Philip Howard, 13th Earl of Arundel (1557–1595) he was first buried in St. Peter ad Vincula and in 1624 his remains were transferred to the Fitzalan Chapel. In 1971 his remains were exhumed and moved to Arundel Cathedral, a year after Pope Paul VI canonized him as one of the Forty Martyrs of England and Wales.
 his wife, Anne Dacre, Countess of Arundel (1557–1630).
 Henry Frederick Howard, 22nd Earl of Arundel (1608–1652)
 his wife, Lady Elizabeth Stuart (1610–1674), daughter of Esme Stuart, 3rd Duke of Lennox
 Henry Howard, 6th Duke of Norfolk (1628–1684)
 his wife, Lady Anne Somerset (1631?–1662), daughter of Edward Somerset, 2nd Marquess of Worcester
 his second wife, Jane Howard, Duchess of Norfolk (née Bickerton; 1643/4–1693)
 Henry Howard, 7th Duke of Norfolk (1655–1701)
 Thomas Howard, 8th Duke of Norfolk (1683–1732)
 Edward Howard, 9th Duke of Norfolk (1686–1777)
 his wife, Mary Howard, Duchess of Norfolk (d. 1773)
 Charles Howard, 10th Duke of Norfolk (1720–1786)
 his wife, Catherine Brockholes (d. 1784)
 Lord Henry Howard-Molyneux-Howard (1766–1824), brother of the 12th Duke of Norfolk
 his wife, Elizabeth Long Howard-Molyneux-Howard (1769–1835)
 their daughter, Juliana Barbara Howard Ogilvy (1812–1833)
 Bernard Howard, 12th Duke of Norfolk (1765–1842)
 Henry Howard, 13th Duke of Norfolk (1791–1856)
 his wife, Charlotte Fitzalan-Howard, Duchess of Norfolk (1788–1870)
 Henry Fitzalan-Howard, 14th Duke of Norfolk (1815–1860)
 his wife Augusta Fitzalan-Howard, Duchess of Norfolk (1821–1886)
 her brother, Richard Lyons, 1st Viscount Lyons (1817–1887)
 their father, Edmund Lyons, 1st Baron Lyons (1790–1858)
 Edward Henry Cardinal Howard, Cardinal-Bishop of Frascati (1829–1892)
 Henry Fitzalan-Howard, 15th Duke of Norfolk (1847–1915)
 Bernard Fitzalan-Howard, 16th Duke of Norfolk (1908–1975)
 his wife, Lavinia Fitzalan-Howard, Duchess of Norfolk (1916–1995)
 Miles Fitzalan-Howard, 17th Duke of Norfolk (1915–2002)
 his wife, Anne Fitzalan-Howard, Duchess of Norfolk (1927–2013)

See also
 Arundel Castle, in whose grounds the chapel is located
 Arundel Museum, close to the castle entrance
 Earls of Arundel
 Arundel Cathedral
 Arundel Priory

References

 The Fitzalan Chapel, pamphlet printed by Arundel Castle

External links
 

14th-century church buildings in England
Arun District
Church of England church buildings in West Sussex
Roman Catholic churches in West Sussex
Tourist attractions in West Sussex
Chapels in England
Roman Catholic cemeteries in England and Wales
Grade I listed buildings in West Sussex
Burial sites of the FitzAlan family